Gaëtan Laura (born 6 August 1995) is a French professional footballer who plays as a forward for Turkish club Samsunspor.

Club career
A prolific footballer in the amateur divisions of French football, Laura joined Paris FC in the French Ligue 2 in the summer of 2020. He made his professional debut with Paris FC in a 3–0 league win over FC Chambly on 22 August 2020, scoring a goal.

On 31 January 2022, he joined Italian club Cosenza on loan with an option to buy.

On 20 June 2022, Laura signed a three-year contract (with an option for a fourth year) with Samsunspor in Turkey.

Career statistics

Club

References

External links
 
 Paris FC Profile

1995 births
Living people
People from Argentan
French footballers
French expatriate footballers
Sportspeople from Orne
Footballers from Normandy
Association football forwards
US Alençon players
Paris FC players
US Quevilly-Rouen Métropole players
Cosenza Calcio players
Samsunspor footballers
Ligue 2 players
Championnat National players
Championnat National 2 players
Championnat National 3 players
Serie B players
TFF First League players
French expatriate sportspeople in Italy
French expatriate sportspeople in Turkey
Expatriate footballers in Italy
Expatriate footballers in Turkey